is a Japanese politician of People's New Party, formerly of the Liberal Democratic Party, a member of the House of Councillors in the Diet (national legislature). A native of Harbin in Manchukuo and graduate of Waseda University, he was elected to the House of Councillors for the first time in 1992 after serving in the assembly of Fukuoka Prefecture for three terms.

References

External links 
  in Japanese.

Members of the House of Councillors (Japan)
Liberal Democratic Party (Japan) politicians
People's New Party politicians
21st-century Japanese politicians
1939 births
Living people